Eucyclotoma hindsii is a species of sea snail, a marine gastropod mollusk in the family Raphitomidae.

Description
The length of the shell varies between 8 mm and 15 mm.

The white shell is faintly variegated with pale brown. The body whorl shows four distant revolving ridges, the others with two. The shell is delicately cancellated with numerous compressed smaller ribs.

Distribution
This marine species occurs off the Philippines, Japan and the Marianas

References

 Liu J.Y. [Ruiyu] (ed.)(2008). Checklist of marine biota of China seas. China Science Press. 1267 pp.

External links
 
 Gastropods.com: Eucyclotoma hindsii

hindsii
Gastropods described in 1843